Yahya son of Ummi Taweel was one of the great companions of Ali Al Sajjad son of Hussein. He was killed by Al Hajjaj Al Thaqafi.

What has been reported about him:

Al Fadhl bin Shadhaan said: “In the time of Ali son of Hussein in the beginning of his matter (successorship of Muhammad) he did not have with him but five people.” Yahya bin Umme Taweel was one of those five.

Imam Ja'far al-Sadiq son of Mohammad said: “After the murder of Al Hussein, all the people reverted away from Islam except for three. They were Abu Khalid Al Kabuli, Yahya Bin Umme Taweel and Jubair Bin Mut'im and the people increased after that.”

Part of his biography
- Imam Mohammad Al Baqir said: “Yahya son of Umme Taweel used to show great bravery and if he walked outside he used to place something on his head. Al Hajaj requested him to attend and said to him: 'Curse Abu Turab (Imam Ali)', so Yahya refused and Al Hajaaj ordered for his arms and legs to be cut off and killed him. And Sa'eed son of Musayib, he was saved because he used to advice people according to the sayings of the general population and because he was the last of the companions of the Messenger of Allah blessings be upon him and his family so that saved him. Abu Khalid Al Kabuli escaped to Mecca and hid himself so he was also saved. 'Amir son of Wathila had a connection with Abdul Malik son of Marwan so he did not allow 'Amir to be killed. Jaabir son of Abdullah Al Ansaari was a companion of the Messenger of Allah blessings be upon him and his family so he was not exposed to harm on top of the fact that he was an elderly man. Furaat son of Ahnaf stayed till the days of Abu Abdillah peace be upon him.”

- Al Yamaan son of Ubaidillah said: “I saw Yahya son of Umme Taweel standing in al Kunase (a place in Kufa, Iraq) and he shouted at the top of his voice: Oh servants of Allah, we are innocent from what you are hearing. Whoever curses Ali then upon him is the curse of Allah. And we disassociate ourselves from ale marwan and whatever they worship other than allah. then he lowers his voice and says: Do not sit with the ones who curse the guardians of Allah and whoever doubts the matter that we are upon then do not start the debates with them. and if your brothers needed to ask you for help then you have already betrayed them! Then he reads: Surely we have prepared for the oppressors a fire, the curtains of which shall encompass them about; and if they cry for water, they shall be given water like molten brass which will scald their faces; evil the drink and ill the resting-place.”

References

7th-century Muslims
History of Shia Islam